Radovan Vlajkovic (18 November 1922 – 12 November 2001) was a Yugoslav politician who served as Chairman of the Collective Presidency of Yugoslavia from 1985 until 1986. He was also Speaker of the Assembly of Vojvodina 1963–1967.

References

Yugoslav communists
Yugoslav Partisans members
1922 births
2001 deaths
People from Ruma
Presidency of the Socialist Federal Republic of Yugoslavia members
Recipients of the Order of the Hero of Socialist Labour